The Professional Association of Internes and Residents of Ontario (PAIRO) is the association that represents all medical doctors in the province of Ontario that are doing post-graduate medical training (residency).

It fulfills the role of a union.

It negotiates with the provincial government on behalf of the interns and residents, like the Ontario Medical Association for physicians with a certificate of registration for independent practise.

PAIRO was responsible for initiatives that lead to the recognition of the dual status of interns and residents as trainees and first-line physicians in hospitals in Ontario.  In 1996, the union negotiated a home after 24/28 hour call rule, similar to the 80-hour week in place in training centres in the United States.  This was augmented by the development of call maxima, limiting residents in Ontario to overnight call one night in four.

See also

Ontario Medical Association
Canadian Medical Association

References

External links
 PAIRO.org - the official website of PAIRO.

Medical and health organizations based in Ontario
Professional associations based in Ontario
Medical associations based in Canada
Trade unions in Ontario